Sorry About Your Daughter is an American rock band from Washington, D.C., United States.

Forming in 1992, the band toured heavily on US college campuses in the middle of the decade. They independently released one record before signing to the European label Edel Records affiliated with Sony Music/BMG. The band toured Europe and released their full-lengths with promotional videos for tracks like “You Gave Up” and “Scapegoat," which occasionally appeared on MTV Europe and Much Music. Their records are available on  iTunes, Spotify, Amazon, etc. On August 17, 2019, the band reunited for a show at The Soundry in Columbia, MD.

Members
 Glenn Hall  – Lead vocals
 Jeff Aug  – Guitars, backing vocals
 Aaron Wertlieb  – Bass, backing vocals
 Karl Hill  – Drums, backing vocals

Discography

Studio albums
Aquarium Center (Diesel Boy Records, 1994)
Aquarium Center (Edel, 1995)
Face (1996) (Edel, 1996) Produced by John Avila (Oingo Boingo)

EPs
Six Bucks (1995)
Afterbirth (2019)

References

External links
 

Musical groups established in 1992
Rock music groups from Washington, D.C.
Musical quartets
Musical groups disestablished in 1997